Rise and Shine (And Give God Your Glory, Glory) also known as The Arky, Arky Song (Children of the Lord) is a humorous children's camp song about Noah's Ark.

History
The song lyrics and tune are loosely adapted from the earlier African American Spiritual song, "We Are Climbing Jacob's Ladder," which was written prior to 1825. Later versions of "We Are Climbing Jacob's Ladder" include the refrain "Rise and Shine and Give God the Glory, Glory." The lyric is likely derived from a similar verse in the Book of Isaiah 60:1 which states: "Arise, shine; for thy light is come, and the glory of the Lord is risen upon thee" in reference to Zion According to some sources, such as Religious Folk Songs of the Hampton Institute, the earliest version of the children's song date to at least 1874, but the 1874 version does not include the Noah lyrics, which appear to have been added in the twentieth century. Today the children's version of the song is commonly sung at various Sunday schools, scout camps and camps for Christian and Jewish children. Notable folk artists such as Pete Seeger have covered the song.

References

American children's songs
Sing-along
Christian songs